In electricity, a switch is a device that can connect, disconnect, or divert current in an electrical circuit.

Switch or The Switch may also refer to:

Sport
 Switch (basketball), change of defensive assignments during a play
 Switch (pickleball), a call, made by one doubles partner to the other, to switch sides
 Switch stance, riding a skateboard, snowboard or other device in the direction not preferred by the rider
 Switch, a mascot of the Tohoku Rakuten Golden Eagles

Technology and computing
 Switch (app), for job searching
 Switch (command line), a directive added to a text command to modify its behavior
 Switch (programming), a programming language statement which controls program flow
 SWITCH, an open electricity system model, primarily applied to Hawaii
 Circuit switch, a component in a circuit-switched telecommunications network 
 Context switch, performed by an operating system in response to an interrupt
 Nintendo Switch, an eighth generation hybrid (home + handheld) video game console
 Packet switch, a component in a packet-switched data network
 Network switch, a computer networking device that uses a form of packet switching
 Switch access, the use of custom devices to make computing available to people with severe physical or cognitive impairment
 SWITCH Information Technology Services, the Swiss education and research network
 Telephone switch, the central part of a telephone system
 Wire switches, on trolley wires
 Payment Switch, an application that switches payment transactions between issuers and acquirers

As a proper name

Brands and enterprises
 Switch (company), a Nevada-based telecommunications company
 Switch (debit card), introduced in the UK in 1988 and later renamed Maestro
 Switch (guitars), a brand of electric guitars and basses made from a synthetic material
 Switch Mobility, manufacturer of electric buses, owned by Ashok Leyland
 Switch Press, an imprint of Capstone Publishers

Arts and entertainment

Film 
 The Switch (1963 film), a British crime drama
 Switch (1991 film), an American comedy by Blake Edwards
 The Switch, a 1993 American film about Larry McAfee and Dr. Russ Fine
 Switch (2007 film), a Norwegian snowboard drama
 The Switch (2010 film), an American romantic comedy
 Switch (2011 film), a French action film
 Switch (2012 film), an American documentary about alternative energy
 Switch (2013 film), a Chinese action film
 The Switch (2022 film), a Canadian drama film directed by Michel Kandinsky
 Switch (2023 film), a South Korean comedy drama film
 Switch (The Matrix), a character in the Matrix franchise

Games
 Switch (card game), a shedding-type game
 Nintendo Switch, a hybrid video game console

Literature and periodicals 
 Switch (manga), a Japanese manga series by Otoh Saki and Tomomi Nakamura
 Switch (2018 manga), a Japanese basketball-themed manga by Atsushi Namikiri
 The Switch, a 1978 novel by Elmore Leonard
 Switch (Mexican magazine), a music magazine
 Switch (Romanian magazine), an LGBT magazine

Music

Performers
 Switch (band), an American R&B/funk band
 Switches (band), a 2000s English rock band
 DJ Switch (disambiguation), several DJs

Albums
 Switch (Golden Earring album) or the title song, "The Switch", 1975
 Switch (INXS album), 2005
 Switch (Switch album), 1978
 Switch (EP), by Schaft, 1994
 The Switch (Body/Head album), 2018
 The Switch (Emily King album) or the title song, 2015

Songs
 "Switch" (Fluke song), 2003
 "Switch" (Howie B song), 1997
 "Switch" (Iggy Azalea song), 2017
 "Switch" (Lisa song), 2004
 "Switch" (Will Smith song), 2005
 "Switch", by 6lack from East Atlanta Love Letter, 2018
 "Switch", by Afrojack and Jewelz & Sparks, 2019
 "Switch", by Ashley Tisdale from Guilty Pleasure, 2009
 "Switch", by the American band Bright from their self-titled album
 "Switch", by the Cure from 4:13 Dream, 2008
 "Switch", by Siouxsie & the Banshees from The Scream, 1978
 "Switch", by Roy Woods from Waking at Dawn, 2016
 "Switch", by Sugababes from Angels with Dirty Faces, 2002
 "The Switch", by Planet Funk from Non Zero Sumness, 2002

Television

Series
 Switch (American TV series), a 1970s series starring Robert Wagner and Eddie Albert
 Switch (British TV series), a 2012 supernatural comedy-drama series
 Switch (South Korean TV series), a 2018 series
 Switch, a 1997 German version of the Australian series Fast Forward
 The Switch (TV series), a Canadian sitcom 
 The Switch Drag Race, a Chilean reality competition series
 Switch, a 2023 American game show

Episodes
 "Switch" (Better Call Saul)
 "Switch" (NCIS)
 "The Switch" (Kappa Mikey)
 "The Switch" (The Rookie)
 "The Switch" (Seinfeld)

Other content
 BBC Switch, a 2007–2010 brand for content aimed at UK teenagers
 Switch? (The Price Is Right), a pricing game on The Price Is Right

Other uses
 Switch (ad campaign), a 2002 campaign by Apple
 Switch (BDSM), a person who switches between dominant and submissive sex roles
 Switch (corporal punishment), a flexible wooden rod used for punishment
 The switch (con), a type of swindle
 Railroad switch, a mechanical installation that creates a junction between multiple railroad tracks

See also 
 Switching (disambiguation)
 Code-switching (disambiguation)
 Switched-mode power supply